Bamboi is a village in the Bole district, a district in the Northern Region of north Ghana. Bamboi is connected by road to the town of Sawla.

References 

Populated places in the Northern Region (Ghana)